Tso-ay, also known as Panayotishn or Pe-nel-tishn, today widely known by his nickname as "Peaches", (c. 1853 – December 16, 1933) was a Chiricahua, Western Apache warrior, who also served as a scout for General George Crook during the Apache wars. Tso-ay was wounded while fighting alongside Geronimo and Chihuahua against Mexican troops, who had ambushed them after the Apache had crossed the border while being pursued by American troops.

Early life
Before serving as a scout for the army, Tso-ay rode with Chatto in a raid. The raid consisted of twenty six men and they traveled 400 miles. They covered between seventy five and one hundred miles a day and killed twenty six settlers. During the raid, Tso-ay, deciding he had had enough of raiding, left the war party to return to the San Carlos Apache Indian Reservation. Following this Tso-ay was captured by Lieutenant Britton Davis who was accompanied by thirty scouts and some Tonto Apache. Davis sent a telegram to Crook notifying him of the capture of Tso-ay, and Crook requested that Davis enlist Tso-ay as a scout, if Tso-ay was willing. Tso-ay joined and was sent to meet with Crook at Willcox, where he was given the nickname "Peaches", because of his fair complexion and the smoothness of his skin. Tso-ay led Crook and his men into the upper Rio Bavispe and brought them to the camps of Chato and Benito.

Tso-Ay was one of Crook's primary scouts and played a major role in leading the army into several of the strongholds the Apache had in Mexico. Although Tso-ay had served loyally he was exiled with Geronimo to Florida following the Apache wars.

He retired in Cibecue and shortly before his death in 1933 he converted to Christianity.

Legacy
Tso-Ay has been mentioned in Valdez is Coming, a western novel by Elmore Leonard.

References

Bibliography

 
 

 

Apache people
Chiricahua
United States Army Indian Scouts
1933 deaths